Thomas Korsgaard Mikkelsen (born 27 August 1983) is a Danish professional footballer who plays as a goalkeeper for Brøndby IF.

Club career

Early years
Mikkelsen started out his career on Funen, playing for local lower division clubs B 1909, FC Fyn, and Næsby between 1998 and 2009.

Vestsjælland
On 17 June 2009, Mikkelsen was announced as the new goalkeeper of newly promoted Danish second tier club FC Vestsjælland. He became the starting goalkeeper for Vestsjælland, and signed a one-year contract extension on 8 July 2011. Six months later Mikkelsen signed another contract extension, this time a two-year deal, keeping him a part of the club until at least 2014. He continued as starting goalkeeper after head coach Ove Pedersen was appointed as replacement for the sacked Michael Schjønberg, and despite a weak start under the new coach results quickly improved. On 16 May 2013, Vestsjælland promoted to the Danish Superliga after a 0–0 draw home against Hobro IK.

On 21 July 2013, Mikkelsen made his first Superliga-appearance in a match against Brøndby which ended in a 1–1 draw. He was a key part of the team that survived the struggle against relegation during the 2013–14 season. The following season, however, Vestsjælland suffered relegation, ending on 11th place in the league table.

A few months later, Vestsjælland went bankrupt after a longer period of financial troubles. This effectively made Mikkelsen a free agent. He ended his tenure with Vestsjælland with 182 league appearances.

Fredericia
Mikkelsen subsequently signed a one-and-a-half year contract with FC Fredericia. Here, he was announced as the starting goalkeeper and made his first appearance in a 1–0 away win over Silkeborg IF in the Danish second tier on 10 March. In his two seasons in Fredericia, Mikkelsen made 46 league appearances.

OB
On 30 March 2017, Danish Superliga club OB announced that Mikkelsen would join the first team on free transfer beginning on 1 July. He signed a two-year contract. Mikkelsen was signed as a backup to starting goalkeeper Sten Grytebust.

Lyngby
After being benched for a season, Mikkelsen was loaned out to Lyngby Boldklub on a six-month deal on 1 September 2018. This deal was made permanent on 9 January 2019, as he signed a one-and-a-half year contract with Lyngby. With Mikkelsen on goal, Lyngby reached promotion to the Danish Superliga.

Brøndby
After Lyngby suffered relegation to the second tier after the 2020–21 season, Mikkelsen signed with defending Danish champions Brøndby IF, joining them from 1 July 2021. Featuring as the backup to Mads Hermansen, Mikkelsen made his debut in goal on 23 September in a 8–1 win over Allerød FK in the Danish Cup. His league debut for Brøndby followed on 17 October in a 3–2 win against Vejle after starter Hermansen suffered an injury. He would also make his European debut during Hermansen's absence, playing the UEFA Europa League group stage match against Rangers, which ended in a 2–0 loss.

International career
In November 2020, at the age of 37, he was called up to Kasper Hjulmand's senior squad for the friendly against Sweden due to several cancellations from, among others, the Danish national team players playing in England, due to the COVID-19 restrictions, as well as a case of COVID-19 in the squad, which had put several national team players in quarantine. He was on the bench for the game against Sweden.

References

External links
Official Danish Superliga stats (Danish)

1983 births
Living people
People from Kerteminde Municipality
Danish men's footballers
Association football goalkeepers
Boldklubben 1909 players
FC Fyn players
Næsby Boldklub players
FC Fredericia players
FC Vestsjælland players
Odense Boldklub players
Lyngby Boldklub players
Brøndby IF players
Danish Superliga players
Danish 1st Division players
Sportspeople from the Region of Southern Denmark